Allen Gavilanes (born August 24, 1999) is an American soccer player who plays for Greenville Triumph SC in USL League One.

Career

Youth, college and amateur
Raised in North Plainfield, New Jersey, Gavilanes played prep soccer at St. Benedict's Preparatory School. After playing youth soccer with the Cedar Stars Academy and East Brunswick Soccer Club, Gavilanes began playing college soccer at Marist College in 2017. In three seasons with the Red Foxes, Gavilanes made 54 appearances, scoring 20 goals and tallying 22 assists. The 2020 season was cancelled due to the COVID-19 pandemic.

Whilst at college, Gavilanes appeared for USL League Two side New York Red Bulls U23 in both 2018 and 2019.

Professional
On April 20, 2021, Gavilanes signed with Greenville Triumph of USL League One. He made his professional debut on May 1, 2021, appearing as a 84th-minute substitute during a 4–0 win over North Texas SC.

References

External links 
 
 Soccerway profile

1999 births
Living people
American soccer players
Association football midfielders
Marist Red Foxes men's soccer players
New York Red Bulls U-23 players
Greenville Triumph SC players
USL League Two players
USL League One players
Soccer players from New Jersey
St. Benedict's Preparatory School alumni
People from North Plainfield, New Jersey